The Winter Paralympic Games "We Are Together. Sports" was an international multi-sport tournament organized by the Russian Paralympic Committee. It was held from 18 to 21 March 2022 in Khanty-Mansiysk, Russia.

The games were organized after Russia and Belarus were banned from the National Paralympic Committee-sanctioned 2022 Winter Paralympics in Beijing. The ban was a response to the 2022 Russian invasion of Ukraine.

The Games

Participating nations
Five nations including the hosts Russia took part in the Games.

 
  (16)
  
  (Host)

Sports
Winter Paralympic Games, "We are together. Sport" featured six sports.

  Alpine skiing
  Biathlon
  Cross-country skiing
  Ice hockey
  Snowboarding
  Wheelchair curling

Medal table
Russia dominated the event, topping the medal tally.

See also
2022 boycott of Russia and Belarus
Friendship Games

References

External links
Results book

2022 in Russian sport
2022 in multi-sport events
Multi-sport events in Russia
2022 in disability sport
Disabled multi-sport events
Sport in Khanty-Mansiysk
March 2022 events in Russia
Reactions to the 2022 Russian invasion of Ukraine